Gilbert Van Eesbeeck (born 14 October 1952) is a Belgian speed skater. He competed in two events at the 1976 Winter Olympics.

References

1952 births
Living people
Belgian male speed skaters
Olympic speed skaters of Belgium
Speed skaters at the 1976 Winter Olympics
Place of birth missing (living people)